Jorma Lievonen (born 17 April 1956) is a Finnish sports shooter. He competed at the 1980 Summer Olympics and the 1984 Summer Olympics.

References

External links
 

1956 births
Living people
Finnish male sport shooters
Olympic shooters of Finland
Shooters at the 1980 Summer Olympics
Shooters at the 1984 Summer Olympics
People from Joensuu
Sportspeople from North Karelia